

Laguna Grande is a lake in the Tarija Department, Bolivia. At an elevation of 3,638 m, its surface area is 6.7 km2.

See also 
 Tajzara Lake

References 

Grande
Landforms of Tarija Department